This article gives a list of platform game series, i.e. video games of the "platform" genre. There are both 2D and 3D variants of such games, with the latter becoming more prevalent from the 32/64-bit era and up to the present.

2D sidescroller/platformer
Platformer or sidescrolling game series that originated in 2D.

10 Second Ninja X
A Boy and His Blob
Adventure Island series
Aero the Acro-Bat
Akane the Kunoichi
Aladdin
Alien Carnage (Halloween Harry)
Amazing Princess Sarah
Another World
Apple Panic
Batman
Beauty and the Beast
Bebe's Kids
Blackthorne
Blaster Master
Bonk series
Braid
Bubble Bobble
Bucky O'Hare
Bud Redhead - The Time Chase
Bugs Bunny
Captain Claw
Captain Comic
Castlevania series
Cave Story
Celeste
Chakan: The Forever Man
Chuck Rock
Commander Keen series
Cosmo's Cosmic Adventure
Crystal Caves
Dangerous Dave
Darkwing Duck
Dig Dug
Dizzy series
DuckTales
Elevator Action
Fancy Pants Adventures
Flashback
Friday the 13th
Flying Dragon: The Secret Scroll
Flying Warriors
Freedom Planet
Gentlemen!
Geometry Dash
Getting Over It with Bennett Foddy
Ghosts 'n Goblins series
Gods (video game)
Gunslugs series
Heart of Darkness (video game)
Hocus Pocus
Hollow Knight
Ice Climber
Jazz Jackrabbit series
Jet Set Willy
Jetpack
Jill of the Jungle
Jumpman / Jumpman Junior
Kangaroo
Kid Icarus
Kirby series
Knytt
Lady Sia
Legend of Kage
Lode Runner
Manic Miner
MapleStory
Mappy
Mega Man (RockMan) series
Metroid
Miner 2049er
Monster Bash
Mr. Nutz: Hoppin' Mad and Mr. Nutz
Mutant Mudds
N
Ninja Five-O
Ninja Gaiden series (8-bit console versions only)
Pac-Land
Pitfall! series
Ponpoko
Popeye
Prinny: Can I Really Be the Hero?
Ristar
Secret Agent
Seiklus
Shadow of the Beast (1989 video game)
Shantae
Shinobi series
Shovel Knight
Snow Bros
Sonic the Hedgehog series
Space Panic
Speedy Eggbert
Strider
Superfrog
Super Mario Bros. series
Super Meat Boy
Techno Cop
Teenage Mutant Ninja Turtles games
The Lion King
The Simpsons games
ToeJam & Earl series
Transformice
Ugh!
Vectorman series
VVVVVV
Wario Land series
Whomp 'Em
Wonder Boy series
WonderKing Online
Wrecking Crew
Xargon

2.5D sidescroller/platformers
A mix of 2D gameplay/3D style gameplay. See 2.5D.

Bionic Commando: Rearmed series
Blade Kitten
Castle of Illusion Starring Mickey Mouse (2013)
Goemon's Great Adventure
Kirby 64: The Crystal Shards
Kirby's Return to Dream Land
Kirby: Triple Deluxe
Kirby: Planet Robobot
Kirby Star Allies
Klonoa series
LittleBigPlanet series
LostWinds
New Super Mario Bros. series
Pandemonium
Shadow Complex
Sonic Colors (DS Version)
Sonic Generations (3DS Version)
Sonic Rush series
Sonic the Hedgehog 4
Sonic Unleashed, Sonic Colors (Wii Version) and the remastered version Sonic Colors: Ultimate, Sonic Generations (PS3 and 360 Versions), Sonic Lost World (Wii U Version) and Sonic Forces - Mainly 3D with 2D sections. Sonic Generations includes the option to play as Classic Sonic, whose gameplay is set in 2D.Super Paper Mario - Combination 2.5D - 3D platforming/RPGSuper Smash Bros. seriesTomba! seriesTrineViewtiful Joe seriesYoshi's Story3D platformers
Platformer series that were born in 3D.40 WinksA Hat in TimeAlice: Madness ReturnsAmerican McGee's AliceApe Escape seriesBanjo-KazooieBilly Hatcher and the Giant EggBlinxBug! seriesBugs Bunny & Taz: Time BustersBugs Bunny: Lost in TimeChameleon TwistConanCrash Bandicoot seriesCroc seriesDr. MutoGiftI-NinjaJak and Daxter seriesJet Set Radio FutureJet Set RadioJett RocketJumping Flash! seriesKameo: Elements of PowerKao The KangarooKingsley's AdventureKirby and the Forgotten LandLegend of KayMaliceMaximo seriesMega Man X7Mr. RobotMushroom MenNicktoons: Attack of the ToybotsNicktoons: Battle for Volcano IslandNicktoons: Globs of DoomPac-Man World seriesPortal RunnerPsychonautsRascalRatchet & Clank seriesRocket: Robot on WheelsRuff Trigger: The Vanocore ConspiracyScalerSEUM: Speedrunners from HellShadow BladeSly Cooper seriesSonic Adventure seriesSorcerySpyro the Dragon seriesSuper Mario Galaxy Tak and the Power of Juju seriesTomb Raider (series)Tonic TroubleToy Story 2: Buzz Lightyear to the RescueTy the Tasmanian Tiger seriesYooka-LayleeVexxVoodoo Vince2D sidescroller/platformer to 3D platformer game series
Game series that were born as a 2D sidescroller/platformer in the first game and evolved into 3D at some point in their sequels.Bubsy seriesCanimals seriesCastlevania seriesCinnamoroll seriesConker seriesDonkey Kong series (2D to 2.5D)Duke Nukem seriesEarthworm Jim seriesGex seriesHello Kitty seriesKeroppi seriesKirby seriesMoshi Monsters seriesMy Melody seriesNinja Gaiden seriesOddworldPrince of Persia seriesRayman seriesRygarSonic the Hedgehog seriesSpark the Electric Jester seriesSuper Mario seriesTamagotchi seriesThe Great Giana SistersOthersA Nightmare on Elm StreetAbuseCaptain America and The Avengers (NES version only)CarVupChuckie EggCliffhangerCongo BongoCrazy ClimberDemolition ManDonald DuckDoukutsu Monogatari (Cave Story)Eternal DaughterFelix the CatFuturamaGilligan's IslandGishGloverHaunted CastleHookIcy TowerInspector GadgetJudge DreddJungle Hunt / Jungle KingJurassic Park games (Genesis)KangarooKnight LoreKnyttKung FuMickey Mouse gamesMiner 2049erMonster PartyMonty on the RunNew Zealand StoryPlokQ*bertQWAKRamboRen and StimpyRoboCopRoc 'N RopeRoller CoasterRush 'n AttackSpider-Man gamesSuperman games (Sega Genesis and SNES)The Incredible HulkThe Jungle BookThe Lion KingThe Smurfs'' games

See also

Lists of video games

Platform